Korol i Shut were a Russian horror punk band from Saint Petersburg that took inspiration and costumes from tales and fables. In Russia, the band has achieved cult status.

History
The band was formed in 1988 by a group of school friends in Saint Petersburg. The founding members were Mikhail "Gorshok" Gorsheniov, Aleksandr "Balu" Balunov, and Aleksandr "Lieutenant" Shchigoliev. Singer Andrei "Kniaz" Kniazev joined the band in 1990 and guitarist Yakov Tsvirkunov joined in 1997. The band's name, which means "The King and the Jester," was adopted in 1992. Previously, the band was called Kontora.

Korol' i Shut's lyrics are written by Kniazev and feature horror stories and folk tales about pirates, trolls, ghosts and vampires, as well as Slavic mythology. Many of their songs, despite their intimidating appearance and style, are actually humorous, sarcastic or ironic (dark humor). The band members wear Misfits-inspired horror make-up onstage.

The band recorded their music for the first time in 1991 in a semi-professional studio. Their music was broadcast on the radio soon after and they began to tour around Saint Petersburg's clubs. They began rehearsing in the club TaMtAm, in which the bands Chimera and Tequilajazzz also started performing. From 1993, Korol' i Shut started touring in Moscow as well.

In 1994, the band released a few copies of a tape named "Bud' kak doma putnik". In 1997, the songs from this tape were re-recorded and released as band's second official album under the name Korol' i Shut.

The band's first official album was 1996's "Kamnem po golove" which was distributed by Melodiya. Many other albums were released since then. The first music video was released in 1998 for the song "Yeli miaso muzhiki".

The band's lead singer, Mikhail Gorsheniov, died of heart failure during the night from 18 to 19 July 2013. After a farewell tour during the fall and winter of 2013, Korol' i Shut officially broke up in January 2014. The surviving members formed a new band named .

However, due to the numerous requests of the fans, the former band members decided to keep the name Korol' i Shut exclusively for the release of the unfinished rock musical TODD.

In 2023, a TV miniseries Korol i Shut was released, that combines band's biography with adaptations of its folk horror stories.

Former members 
 Mikhail "Gorshok" Gorshenyov (Михаил «Горшок» Горшенёв) - vocals, acoustic guitar (1988-2013)
 Andrei "Kniaz" Kniazev (Андрей «Князь» Князев) - vocals, lyrics (1989-2011)
 Aleksandr "Balu" Balunov (Александр «Балу» Балунов) — bass guitar, guitar (1988-2006)
 Dmitry "Ryabchik" Ryabchenko (Дмитрий «Рябчик» Рябченко) — bass guitar
 Aleksei "Yagoda" Gorshenyov (Алексей «Ягода» Горшенёв) — drums (1993-1995)
 Maria "Masha" Nefyodova (Мария «Маша» Нефёдова) — violin (1998-2004)
 Dmitry "Casper" Rishko (Дмитрий Ришко) - violin (2006-2011)
 Yakov "Yasha" Tsvirkunov (Яков «Яша» Цвиркунов) - guitars, backing vocal (1995-2013)
 Aleksandr "Poruchik" Shchigolyev (Александр «Поручик» Щиголев) - drums (1988-2013)
 Pavel "Pakhan" Sazhinov (Павел Сажинов) - keyboards (1998-2013)
 Aleksandr "Renegat" Leontyev (Александр «Ренегат» Леонтьев) — guitar (2001-2006; 2011-2013)
 Sergei "Zakhar" Zakharov (Сергей «Захар» Захаров) - bass guitar (2006-2013)

Discography

References

External links 

 Official site
 Unofficial forum
 RussMus.Net: Korol i Shut Lyrics and English translations

Musical groups from Saint Petersburg
Russian punk rock groups
Musical groups established in 1988
Horror punk groups
Soviet punk rock groups
Musical groups disestablished in 2014